The following article is a summary of the 2018–19 football season in Armenia, which is the 27th season of competitive football in the country and runs from August 2018 to May 2019.

League tables

Armenian Premier League

Armenian First League

Armenian Cup

Final

National team

2018–19 UEFA Nations League

UEFA Euro 2020 qualification

References

 
Seasons in Armenian football